Craig Slater (born 26 April 1994) is a Scottish professional football player and coach. He plays as a midfielder for Forfar Athletic in Scottish League Two, and is also first team coach at Scottish Women's Premier League team Motherwell.

Slater began his career at St Mirren but left in 2012 to join Kilmarnock. He made his professional debut in December 2012 and went on to spend four years at the club, making 85 appearances. He left in 2016 to join English League Two club Colchester United. After a loan spell with Dundee United he moved to Partick Thistle in 2018 and then Queen's Park in 2020 before joining Forfar in 2021.

Slater has represented Scotland at under-16, under-17, under-19 and under-21 levels.

Club career
Born in Glasgow, Slater played for the youth teams at St Mirren "since the age of five or six". On leaving school in 2010 at the age of 16, he signed professional terms and a two-year contract. However, he said "going into training every day just wasn't enjoyable any more and I felt as if I wasn't going anywhere with the club" and asked to have his contract terminated in 2012. He briefly trained with Rangers but he left with the club suffering financial difficulty, before joining Kilmarnock.

Kilmarnock
Slater made his professional debut for Kilmarnock on 29 December 2012, in an away match against Motherwell coming on as a substitute in a 2–2 draw. He made one further appearance for Killie during the 2012–13 season, starting in their 3–1 home defeat by Hibernian on 15 May 2013.

In the 2013–14 season, after a substitute appearance on the opening day of the season, Slater began to establish himself in the first-team during the Autumn of 2013, and in February 2014, he was named as the SPFL Young Player of the Month for January. He scored his first career goal on 29 March when he scored the winning goal in injury time in Kilmarnock's 2–1 win away to Motherwell. He ended the season having made 22 league appearances and one cup appearance.

Slater scored on the opening day of the 2014–15 season in the 1–1 draw with Dundee. He received his first red card on 1 January 2015 against his former employers St Mirren. He had just converted a penalty kick to put Kilmarnock 2–0 up, but he was shown a second yellow card after running to celebrate with supporters. He scored two more goals to bring his tally to four for the season in his 27 appearances.

Slater scored in his first game of the season for the second successive season with a goal in Kilmarnock's 4–1 League Cup win against Berwick Rangers on 25 August 2015. He scored four goals in 32 appearances. After helping his side to Scottish Premiership survival by beating Falkirk 4–1 on aggregate, on 23 May 2016, Slater announced that he was to leave Kilmarnock. He had rejected the offer of a new deal.

Colchester United
On 7 July 2016, Slater joined English League Two club Colchester United, signing a two-year contract. He made his debut for Colchester on 6 August in their 1–1 draw with Hartlepool United at Victoria Park on the opening day of the season. He scored his first Colchester goal with a free kick in their 2–1 defeat to Plymouth Argyle at Home Park on 29 October. He was ruled out for the remainder of the 2016–17 season in March 2017 following an operation for a double hernia and groin problems, having scored three goals in 32 games in all competitions.

On 3 January 2018, Slater joined Scottish Championship club Dundee United on loan until the end of the 2017–18 season. He made his debut on 6 January in United's 6–1 defeat at Falkirk and was substituted off after 59-minutes. He scored his first goal for the club on 28 April in United's 2–0 win over Livingston.

At the end of the 2017–18 season he was released by Colchester.

On 2 July 2018 he joined Danish Superliga side AC Horsens for a short trial.

Partick Thistle
Slater joined Scottish Championship side Partick Thistle on a one-year deal in July 2018. He left the club in January 2020.

Queen's Park
Later that month Slater signed for Scottish League Two side Queen's Park. He would win the league with the Spiders, prior to leaving the club in 2021.

Forfar Athletic 
In May 2021, Forfar Athletic announced that they had signed Slater on a two-year deal.

International career
Slater has represented Scotland at under-16, under-17, under-19 and under-21 levels.

He made his under-16 debut against Jersey on 18 August 2009, and made four appearances in total.

Slater made ten appearances for the under-17 team between his debut against Iceland in July 2009 and March 2011. He scored one goal for the team in Scotland's 2–1 win against the United States in November 2010.

Slater played one game for Scotland's under-19 team on 9 April 2013 when they defeated their Serbian counterparts 2–1.

On 5 March 2014, Slater made his debut for the Scotland under-21 side, starting in a 2–2 draw against Hungary at Tannadice. Between 2014 and 2016, he made ten appearances for the under-21s.

Coaching career
Slater joined Scottish Women's Premier League team Motherwell in July 2021, working as first team coach under head coach Paul Brownlie.

Career statistics

Honours 
Queen's Park

 Scottish League Two: 2020–21

References

External links
Craig Slater profile at the official Colchester United F.C. website

1994 births
Living people
Footballers from Glasgow
Scottish footballers
Association football midfielders
Scotland youth international footballers
Scotland under-21 international footballers
St Mirren F.C. players
Kilmarnock F.C. players
Colchester United F.C. players
Dundee United F.C. players
Partick Thistle F.C. players
Scottish Premier League players
Scottish Professional Football League players
English Football League players
Queen's Park F.C. players
Forfar Athletic F.C. players